Thirty Mile Point Light is a lighthouse on the south shore of Lake Ontario in Niagara County, New York. It is part of Golden Hill State Park, a New York state park. The lighthouse is open to the public. It gets its name because it is the point 30 miles east of the Niagara River. The lighthouse was built in 1875 of hand-carved stone. The old tower is being restored.

The lighthouse is listed in the Historic American Buildings Survey as NY-6154. There are three photos available in the survey. It was added to the National Register of Historic Places in 1984.

Thirty Mile Point Light was one of five lighthouses chosen for the "Lighthouses of the Great Lakes" postage stamp series designed by Howard Koslow in 1995. There was one lighthouse chosen on each of the Great Lakes. The four other lighthouses were Split Rock Light on Lake Superior, St Joseph Light on Lake Michigan, Spectacle Reef Light on Lake Huron, and Marblehead Light on Lake Erie.

References

Further reading
 Oleszewski, Wes. Great Lakes Lighthouses, American and Canadian: A Comprehensive Directory/Guide to Great Lakes Lighthouses, (Gwinn, Michigan: Avery Color Studios, Inc., 1998) .
 
 U.S. Coast Guard. Historically Famous Lighthouses (Washington, D.C.: Government Printing Office, 1957).
 Wright, Larry and Wright, Patricia. Great Lakes Lighthouses Encyclopedia Hardback (Erin: Boston Mills Press, 2006)

External links

 Friends of Thirty Mile Point Lighthouse
 Lighthouse Friends site
 US-Lighthouses.com
 
 National Park Service Historic Lighthouses
 NPS Thirty Mile Point
 Lighthouses of the Great Lakes Seaway Trail
 Aerial Photo

Lighthouses completed in 1876
Lighthouses on the National Register of Historic Places in New York (state)
Transportation buildings and structures in Niagara County, New York
National Register of Historic Places in Niagara County, New York
1876 establishments in New York (state)
Lighthouses of the Great Lakes